Daniel Joseph Godfread (born June 14, 1967) is an American retired professional basketball player at the center position with the Minnesota Timberwolves in the 1990–91 NBA season and the Houston Rockets in the 1991–92 NBA season.  He also played in the Continental Basketball Association for the Rockford Lightning.

Born in Fort Wayne, Indiana, he played collegiately for the Evansville Purple Aces after attending Stillman Valley High School in Stillman Valley, Illinois.

References

External links
Career statistics

1967 births
Living people
American expatriate basketball people in Italy
American expatriate basketball people in Spain
American expatriate basketball people in Turkey
American men's basketball players
Basketball players from Fort Wayne, Indiana
BC Andorra players
American expatriate basketball people in Andorra
CB Granada players
Centers (basketball)
Evansville Purple Aces men's basketball players
FC Barcelona Bàsquet players
Houston Rockets players
Liga ACB players
Melilla Baloncesto players
Minnesota Timberwolves players
People from Stillman Valley, Illinois
Real Betis Baloncesto players
Rockford Lightning players
Ülker G.S.K. basketball players
Undrafted National Basketball Association players